Hegg is an unincorporated community located in the town of Ettrick, Trempealeau County, Wisconsin, United States. The community was named for Hans Christian Heg, an antislavery activist. The post office was established in August 1873 with Knud Hallenger as postmaster.

Notes

Unincorporated communities in Trempealeau County, Wisconsin
Unincorporated communities in Wisconsin